Bjarne Pettersson (born February 16, 1952) is a former Danish football player.

He most prominently played for Vanløse IF and Herfølge BK. He played 7 caps for the Denmark national football team and scored 3 goals.

His brother Jan Pettersson was also a footballer, who played one game for the Danish national team.

References

1952 births
Living people
Danish men's footballers
Denmark international footballers
Boldklubben af 1893 players
Herfølge Boldklub players
Association football forwards